Ogags was a Philippine prime time reality sketch comedy show produced and aired by TV5 from August 13, 2008 to March 31, 2010, replacing Judge Bao.

Overview
The show featured comedy sketches, performed by the main host Ariana Barouk with her co-hosts and guests. The concept of the show was a foreigner trying to speak Tagalog and mispronouncing the words. The script was never given to the foreign hosts, it was purposely read on camera, to make fun of the foreigner trying to pronounce each Tagalog word.

The show had various addition segments that featured Jackass-esque stunts from The Calamity Fun, The Ogagsters in "Silent Lamay" featuring RJ! also joined by Gomz, Mad Killah, Caloy Alde and other celebrities. OGAGS was taped throughout the many Islands of the Philippines. Upon the station being taken over by new management the network re-vamped and many shows were cancelled and replaced by new ones, as was Ogags in 2010.

Cast
Main host
 Ariana Barouk (2008–2010)
Co-host
 Bogart (2009–2010)
 Mihaela Gibrea (2009)
 Daiana Menezes (2008)

References

OGAGS
2008 Philippine television series debuts
2010 Philippine television series endings
Philippine variety television shows
Philippine comedy television series
Filipino-language television shows